The middleweight was the second-heaviest boxing weight class held as part of the boxing at the 1904 Summer Olympics programme. The competition was held on September 22, 1904. It was the first time the event, like all other boxing events, was held in Olympic competition. Middleweights had to be lighter than 71.7 kilograms. There were two entrants in this competition.

Results

References

Sources
 

Middleweight